Gerhard Dewitz (December 16, 1926 – May 24, 2008) was a German politician of the Christian Democratic Union (CDU) and former member of the German Bundestag.

Life 
Dewitz was an administrator by profession. He joined the CDU in 1958. On February 20, 1990, he succeeded Gabriele Rost, who had left the party, as representative of Berlin in the German Bundestag and remained a member until the end of the parliamentary term in the same year.

Literature

References

1926 births
2008 deaths
Members of the Bundestag for Berlin
Members of the Bundestag 1987–1990
Members of the Bundestag for the Christian Democratic Union of Germany